Cowlam is a hamlet in the Cottam civil parish of the East Riding of Yorkshire, England, and in the Yorkshire Wolds. The hamlet contains eight houses and two farms.

History

Older names for the settlement were 'Colume' and 'Coleham', and the Domesday Book lists the manor as 'Colnun'. Cowlam in 1066 was in the Hundred of Toreshou, of eighteen geld units—taxable units assessed by hide area—and contained 5.6 households and three ploughlands. In 1066 the lordship was held by Ketilbert, who held thirteen manors in the north of Yorkshire. Cowlam was transferred in 1086 directly to king William I.

Cowlam was previously a Bronze Age encampment, evidenced by earthworks,  from the hamlet, and a later medieval village that was deserted in the late 17th century.

The church of St Mary at Cowlam is one of the churches on the Sykes Churches Trail. It is a small medieval church with a Norman font, and was restored in 1852 to a design by Mary E. Sykes, daughter of Sir Tatton Sykes, 4th Baronet. The living of the parish was held by the family of Barnard Foord Bowes. In 1966 the church was designated a Grade II listed building and is now recorded in the National Heritage List for England, maintained by Historic England.

References

External links

Deserted medieval villages in the East Riding of Yorkshire
Hamlets in the East Riding of Yorkshire